is a Japanese swimmer.

She competed at the 2016 Summer Olympics in Rio de Janeiro, where she qualified to the final in the women's 400 metre individual medley.

References

1992 births
Living people
Japanese female medley swimmers
Olympic swimmers of Japan
Swimmers at the 2016 Summer Olympics
Asian Games medalists in swimming
Asian Games gold medalists for Japan
Asian Games silver medalists for Japan
Asian Games bronze medalists for Japan
Medalists at the 2014 Asian Games
Medalists at the 2018 Asian Games
Swimmers at the 2014 Asian Games
Swimmers at the 2018 Asian Games
Universiade bronze medalists for Japan
Universiade medalists in swimming
Medalists at the 2013 Summer Universiade
21st-century Japanese women